Prophet is an integrated growth consulting firm that specializes in strategy, transformation, innovation, branding, marketing, and design. The firm is headquartered in San Francisco and has offices in the United States, Europe, and Asia. The firm is best known for BP's Beyond Petroleum strategy and T-Mobile's "Un-carrier" positioning.

History
Prophet was founded in 1992 by Scott Galloway and Ian Chaplin, both graduates of the University of California, Berkeley's Haas School of Business.

In 1998, Michael Dunn was named company president. Around the same time, author and consultant David Aaker began working with Prophet. Aaker currently serves as the company's vice chairman. Dunn was named chief executive officer in 2000. He is currently the firm's chairman and CEO. Prophet's annual revenue has grown to approximately $125 million with over 500 employees worldwide.

Acquisitions
In early 2009, Prophet acquired Richmond, Virginia-based Play, a creativity and innovation company. Prophet acquired Noshokaty, Döring & Thun, a Berlin-based strategic marketing firm in 2011, which brought in clients including Allianz, Deutsche Telekom, General Motors Europe, Deutsche Postbank, Sony, and Volkswagen.

In 2012, Prophet acquired several agencies beginning with (r)evolution, an Atlanta-based branding, marketing, and innovation consultancy. Prophet then acquired the Material Group, a Chicago-based digital design and development studio. Later that year Prophet also acquired Figtree, a brand and design firm with offices in London and Hong Kong.

In 2015, Prophet acquired Altimeter Group, the technology firm founded by Charlene Li. Altimeter operates under the name Altimeter, a Prophet Company. Its focus is research related to digital transformation, customer experience and connected technology.

In 2021, Prophet acquired KEYLENS Management Consultants, a German management consultancy with offices in Munich and Hamburg. KEYLENS operates under the name KEYLENS, a Prophet Company.

Locations
Prophet has 15 offices worldwide:

 North America
 Atlanta
 Chicago
 New York City
 Richmond
 San Francisco
 Austin
 Europe
 Berlin
 London
 Zürich
 Munich
 Hamburg
 Asia
 Hong Kong
 Shanghai
 Singapore
 Dubai

References

Branding companies of the United States
Management consulting firms of the United States
Marketing organizations
Consulting firms established in 1992
1992 establishments in California